Ernie is an orange Muppet character created and originally performed by Jim Henson for the long-running children's television show Sesame Street. He and his roommate Bert form the comic duo Bert and Ernie, one of the program's centerpieces, with Ernie acting the role of the naïve troublemaker, and Bert the world weary foil.

Characteristics
Ernie has a characteristic chuckling laugh (a trait he shares with his baby cousin, Ernestine), and he also has his signature pronunciation of the word "again" (ay-gain). He is a friend and roommate of Bert; they share an apartment on Sesame Street. Ernie's appearance and clothing contrast with Bert, as he is the shorter and more rotund of the pair, and he wears a shirt with horizontal stripes, whereas Bert's shirt has vertical stripes, and Bert has a tall, narrow head while Ernie's is wider than it is high. Additionally, Ernie has no visible eyebrows, while Bert displays a pronounced unibrow.

Ernie is known for his fondness for baths with his Rubber Duckie and for trying to learn to play the saxophone. Ernie is also known for keeping Bert awake at night, for reasons such as wanting to play the drums, wanting to count something (like sheep), to observe something like a blackout, or even because he is waiting for his upstairs neighbor to drop his shoes.

Appearances

Sesame Street
Many Ernie and Bert sketches involve Ernie wanting to play a game with Bert, who would much rather do something else (like read). Ernie keeps irking Bert with the game until Bert joins — and usually, by the time Bert starts enjoying the game, Ernie is tired of playing the game and wants to do something else.

Other sketches have involved them sharing some food by dividing it equally, only for one of them to have a bit more than the other, leading Ernie to make it even by eating the extra piece. Ernie makes appearances without Bert, usually within the framework of another double act. He has regularly appeared in skits with Grover, Cookie Monster, Sherlock Hemlock and Lefty the Salesman.

A typical Bert and Ernie skit has Ernie coming up with a harebrained idea, and Bert trying to talk him out of it, ending with Bert losing his temper, while Ernie becomes oblivious to his own bad idea. Other sketches have involved Bert and Ernie sharing a snack by division, but finding that one of them has a bit more; Ernie humorously decides to try to make it even by eating the extra piece, which goes forth until the entire snack is all eaten up.

Others have also involved Ernie eating part of Bert's snack he prepares for himself, and when Bert comes back from somewhere, Ernie tries to make several attempts to cover up the crime in front of Bert, which is not successful mostly. Some other plotlines involved Ernie wanting to play a game with Bert who wants to do something else; he continues playing until he gets Bert in, but when Bert finally wants to continue playing the game, Ernie is tired of playing, and wants to do something else.

However, Bert's twin brother Bart is depicted as a traveling salesman, which would mean Bert (and probably Ernie) are both adults. Ernie also appeared in the finales of The Muppet Movie and The Muppets Take Manhattan, in the last of which he got a line. In Christmas Eve on Sesame Street, Ernie decided to buy Bert a cigar box to store his paper clips in. However, as he did not have any money, he traded his own Rubber Duckie for it. At the same time, Bert decided to get Ernie a soap dish to put his Rubber Duckie in, so that it would not keep falling into the tub, but had to trade his paper clips for it. However, Mr. Hooper could tell that neither of them really wanted to give up their prized possessions, so Mr. Hooper gave them their things back as presents.

Ernie and Bert introduced a montage of Sesame Street clips in The Muppets: A Celebration of 30 Years. Ernie also narrated a Christmas pageant, 'Twas the Night Before Christmas, in A Muppet Family Christmas. In that same special, Ernie and Bert had a conversation with Doc, making them the only Sesame Street characters (not counting Kermit the Frog) to have interacted with Doc.

In Sesame Street... 20 Years & Still Counting, he and Bert got a new video camera, and he talked Bert into using the camera to record footage of Sesame Street so that they could watch Sesame Street on television.

Journey to Ernie
From Season 33 (2002) until Season 36 (2005), Ernie and Big Bird starred in a daily segment called "Journey to Ernie". Ernie was one of the hosts of the show Play with Me Sesame, where he was performed by John Tartaglia during the second season. One regular segment that he hosted was "Ernie Says", a variation of the game Simon Says.

Role in other projects
Ernie sang about his affection for Rubber Duckie in a skit, which aired during the first season of Sesame Street. The song "Rubber Duckie" from that skit became a modest mainstream hit, reaching No. 16 on the Billboard Hot 100 in September 1970.

Ernie appears in both of the Sesame Street movies. In Follow That Bird, he and Bert search for Big Bird by plane. Ernie pilots the plane, and eventually, after they find Big Bird, he flies the plane upside-down, singing "Upside Down World". However, after they lose Big Bird, Ernie blames Bert. Ernie and Bert also appear in Out to Lunch, and are the hosts of this crossover special.

Ernie appears in the video special 123 Count with Me, teaching Humphrey and Ingrid at the Furry Arms Hotel how counting can be very useful.

Performing Ernie
Ernie is a "Live Hand Muppet," meaning that while operating the head of the puppet with his right hand, the puppeteer inserts his left hand into a T shaped sleeve, capped off with a glove that matches the fabric "skin" of the puppet, thus "becoming" the left arm of the puppet. A second puppeteer usually provides the right arm, although sometimes the right arm is simply stuffed and pinned to the puppet's chest or the second puppeteer will perform both arms.

The original segment of the song "I Don't Want To Live On The Moon" was one of the rare instances when Ernie's full body was shown. It reportedly took three puppeteers to perform Ernie in this segment: Jim Henson performed Ernie's head and left hand, while two other puppeteers operated Ernie's right hand and feet respectively. Other puppets of this type include Cookie Monster, Fozzie Bear, Beaker, and Bunsen Honeydew.

Jim Henson's original Ernie puppet is currently on display at the Center for Puppetry Arts in Atlanta, Georgia.

In other media

Books
Ernie is the subject of numerous books including:
2021, Bert & Ernie, Random House 
2019, The Importance of Being Ernie (and Bert), Imprint 
2012, Bert and Ernie Go Camping, Candlewick Press 
1992, Ernie And His Merry Monsters, Western Publishing 
1990, Ernie and Bert's New Kitten, Random House 
1987, Ernie's Neighborhood, Western Publishing 
1987, Just like Ernie, Golden Books Publishing 
1987, Little Ernie's Animal Friends, Random House 
1984, The Adventures of Ernie & Bert in Twiddlebug Land, Random House 
1983, Ernie's Little Lie, Random House 
1981, Ernie's Big Mess, Random House 
1984, Ernie's Work of Art, Western Publishing 
1979, The Many Faces of Ernie, Western Publishing

Theme parks
Ernie was one of the first characters to appear at Sesame Place theme park as a costumed character, in May 1983. (He had previously appeared at the attraction's groundbreaking event.)

International
Sesame Street is localized for some different markets, and Ernie is often renamed. For instance, in episodes that are aired in Portugal, Ernie's name has been changed to Egas, in Brazil, his name is Ênio, in Spain, he is renamed "Epi", in Latin America, his name is "Enrique", on Egyptian Alam Simsim (Sesame World) Ernie's name is given as "Shadi" (rhyming with Bert's which is "Hadi"), in Russia, he also known as Yenik (Еник), in Turkey, he is named "Edi", in Israel, he is called "Arik" (אריק) and in Norway, he is known as "Erling".

References

Sesame Street Muppet characters
Television characters introduced in 1969

de:Sesamstraße#Ernie und Bert
sv:Ernie (mupp)